Inez Fischer-Credo (born 10 September 1928) is a Canadian retired equestrian. She was born in Mexico City. She competed at the 1964 Summer Olympics in Tokyo, and at the 1968 Summer Olympics in Mexico City.

References

External links

1928 births
Living people
Sportspeople from Mexico City
Canadian female equestrians
Canadian dressage riders
Olympic equestrians of Canada
Equestrians at the 1964 Summer Olympics
Equestrians at the 1968 Summer Olympics
Pan American Games medalists in equestrian
Pan American Games bronze medalists for Canada
Equestrians at the 1967 Pan American Games
Medalists at the 1967 Pan American Games
21st-century Canadian women
20th-century Canadian women